Major-General Valentine Boucher CB CBE (14 February 1904 – 1 April 1961) was a British Army officer who served as Director of Military Intelligence.

Military career
Boucher was commissioned into The Buffs (Royal East Kent Regiment). He served in the Second World War as commanding officer of the 9th Battalion The Buffs from May 1942 and Director of Movements at General Headquarters, India from January 1944, three months after his promotion to brigadier.

After the War, he became Director of Personnel Movement at the War Office in 1946, Deputy Director of Military Intelligence at the War Office in 1948 and Commander of 24th Infantry Brigade in 1950. He went on to be Director of Military Intelligence in July 1953 in which role he sought to ban the publication of The London Cage, a book by Alexander Scotland, which included allegations of torture by British soldiers and which a War Office Security official at MI11 decided "would not show the War Office on a good light". His last appointment was as Commander of the British Army Staff at the British Joint Services Mission in Washington, D.C. in June 1956 before retiring in January 1958.

He also served as colonel of the Buffs from 4 June 1953. He was appointed a Commander of the Order of the British Empire on the 1946 New Year Honours and a Companion of the Order of the Bath in the 1954 Birthday Honours.

References

Sources

Further reading

External links
Generals of World War II

1904 births
1961 deaths
British Army major generals
British Army brigadiers of World War II
Buffs (Royal East Kent Regiment) officers
Commanders of the Order of the British Empire
Companions of the Order of the Bath